Bengt Gustafsson may refer to:

Bengt Gustafsson (astronomer) (born 1943), Swedish professor of astronomy
Bengt-Åke Gustafsson (born 1958), Swedish ice hockey player and coach
Bengt Gustafsson (general) (1933–2019), Supreme Commander of the Swedish Armed Forces 1986–1994

See also  
 Bengt Gustafson (born 1963), Sweden volleyball player